Michaël Babin (born 20 March 1970) is a French ice hockey player. He competed in the men's tournament at the 1992 Winter Olympics.

References

1970 births
Living people
Olympic ice hockey players of France
Ice hockey players at the 1992 Winter Olympics
Sportspeople from Caen
Ducs d'Angers players